David O. Brink (born 1958) is Distinguished Professor of Philosophy at the University of California, San Diego.  He works in the areas of moral, political, and legal philosophy.

Education and career
He earned his Ph.D. in philosophy at Cornell University where he worked with Terence Irwin and David Lyons. He taught for two years at Case Western Reserve University, and then from 1987 to 1994 at Massachusetts Institute of Technology before joining the faculty at UCSD.

Philosophical views
Brink is associated with the view known as "Cornell Realism." Cornell realism was developed in the 1980s by the philosophers Richard Boyd and Nicholas Sturgeon, both faculty members at Cornell University. The view combines ethical realism with moral naturalism. Ethical realism holds that ethical judgments, such as "murder is wrong," are factual claims similar to "Albany is the Capital of New York" in being objectively true or objectively false. Moral naturalism holds that moral properties – such as the properties of being right, wrong, good, bad, virtuous or vicious – are natural properties that have a status comparable to other natural properties, such as those of being a tiger, being gold, or being an electron.

Selected works
 Mill's Progressive Principles (Oxford:  Clarendon Press, 2013).
 Perfectionism and the Common Good:  Themes in the Philosophy of T.H. Green (Oxford:  Clarendon Press, 2003).
 Moral Realism and the Foundations of Ethics (New York:  Cambridge University Press, 1989)

References

1958 births
20th-century American essayists
20th-century American male writers
20th-century American philosophers
21st-century American essayists
21st-century American male writers
21st-century American philosophers
American ethicists
American male essayists
Analytic philosophers
Cornell University alumni
Living people
MIT School of Humanities, Arts, and Social Sciences faculty
Moral realists
Philosophers of law
Philosophers of social science
Philosophy writers
Political philosophers
Social philosophers
University of California, San Diego faculty